Air pollution in the United Kingdom has long been considered a significant health issue, and it causes numerous other environmental problems such as damage to buildings, forests, and crops. Many areas, including major cities like London, are found to be significantly and regularly above legal and recommended pollution levels. Air pollution in the UK is a major cause of diseases such as asthma, lung disease, stroke, cancer, and heart disease, and is estimated to cause forty thousand premature deaths each year, which is about 8.3% of deaths, while costing around £40 billion each year.

Air pollution is monitored and regulated. Air quality targets for particulates, nitrogen dioxide and ozone, set by the Department for Environment, Food and Rural Affairs (DEFRA), are mostly aimed at local government representatives responsible for the management of air quality in cities, where air quality management is the most urgent. In 2017, research by the Lancet Countdown on Health and Climate Change and the Royal College of Physicians revealed that air pollution levels in 44 cities in the UK are above the recommended World Health Organization guidelines.

The UK government has plans to improve pollution due to traffic, and is banning the sale of new fossil fuel cars by 2030, and is phasing out the use of coal in its electrical power generation.

History

Prehistory to the 20th century
Air pollution is often assumed to have begun with the Industrial Revolution, but it's a much older problem.

Mining has existed in Great Britain since prehistoric times and lead mines (such as Charterhouse in Somerset and Odin Mine in Derbyshire) may have been worked before Roman Britain. The Pipe Rolls refer to lead and silver smelting in the Middle Ages. Research on a Swiss ice-core indicates that atmospheric pollution containing lead between the years 1170 and 1216 was as high as that during the Industrial Revolution, correlating accurately with smelting in the Peak District, the primary European source of lead and silver at the time, with spikes in pollution associated closely with the increasing power of successive monarchs during their reigns.

In 1306, Edward I introduced the first prohibitive environmental law, against the usage of 'sea coal' from Northumbria. Sulphur-rich coal from this exposed seam was increasingly being used because of dwindling supplies of wood in and around cities, but it produced stifling smoke and fumes. The legislation made little difference to the population even up to Elizabeth I's time.

By the 1600s, smoke pollution was also having an effect on building exteriors. In a landmark legal case from 1610, judgement was awarded to William Aldred against his neighbour, with references to the smell of pig sties and fumes from lime kilns, "stopping of the wholesome air" and "infecting and corrupting the air."

Through the 1800s, coal-burning for the Industrial Revolution in particular made the UK the world's leading source of carbon-based air pollution by a great margin (surpassed by the United States in 1888 and Germany in 1913). Local campaigning societies sprang up to complain about the health risks, such as the Committee for the Consumption of Smoke in Leeds.  The Alkali Act of 1863 was passed – and intermittently amended – to regulate irritant gaseous hydrochloric acid produced in the Leblanc process to make sodium carbonate, but also the sulphuric acid often caused by emissions from the same factories. The Public Health Act was passed in 1875, which legislated not just for the health effects of air pollution but also the visual effects.

Greater scientific efforts to measure air pollution played an increasing part in drawing attention to the problem. Robert Angus Smith made the first measurements of acid rain from rain samples in 1852. Several decades later, Irish physician and environmental engineer John Switzer Owens and the Committee for the Investigation of Atmospheric Pollution collected and compared pollution using a network of deposit gauges.

Experiments by the London County Council and the Meteorological Council from 1902 to 1903 found that 20% of London fogs were due to smoke alone, all were made denser and longer-lasting by smoke and that the death rate "enormously expands" during the fogs. By the 20th century – at least – respiratory diseases were the UK's biggest killers [the death-rate from bronchitis in the UK remained the highest in the world in the early 1950s, 65 per 100,000 in England and Wales, more than twice than of the nearest other country, Belgium].

The Great Smog of 1952

Early in December 1952, a cold fog descended upon London. Because of the cold, Londoners began to burn more coal than usual. The resulting air pollution was trapped by the inversion layer formed by the dense mass of cold air. Concentrations of pollutants, coal smoke in particular, built up dramatically. The problem was made worse by use of low-quality, high-sulphur coal for home heating in London in order to permit export of higher-quality coal, because of the country's tenuous postwar economic situation. The "fog", or smog, was so thick that driving became difficult or impossible. The extreme reduction in visibility was accompanied by an increase in criminal activity as well as transportation delays and a virtual shut down of the city. During the 4 day period of smog, some 3,000–4,000 people were estimated to have died, though more recent estimates suggest the actual figure may have been as high as 12,000.

Recent history

Four years after the Great London Smog, parliament passed the Clean Air Act, which made a substantial difference to urban air quality. Even so, air pollution remains a serious environmental issue in the UK over half a century later.

In April 2014, for example, there were warnings of 'very high' air pollution for many areas of England. High levels of pollution in London and other parts of the south east of England were bad enough to cause sore eyes and sore throats and experts warned those with heart conditions and asthma to stay inside.

Attempts to tackle air pollution through legislation have also continued. On 29 April 2015, the UK Supreme Court ruled that the government must take immediate action to cut air pollution, following a case brought by environmental lawyers at ClientEarth.

Published pollution information

The UK has established an air quality network where levels of the key air pollutants are published by monitoring centres. Air quality in Oxford, Bath and London is particularly poor. One study performed by the Calor Gas company and published in The Guardian newspaper compared walking in Oxford on an average day to smoking over sixty light cigarettes.

The UK Air Quality Archive contains more precise information which permits a cities management of pollutants to be compared against the national air quality objectives set by DEFRA in 2000

Localized peak values are often cited, but average values are also important to human health. The UK National Air Quality Information Archive offers almost real-time monitoring of "current maximum" air pollution measurements for many UK towns and cities. This source offers a wide range of constantly updated data, including:

 Hourly Mean Ozone (µg/m3)
 Hourly Mean Nitrogen dioxide (µg/m3)
 Maximum 15-Minute Mean Sulphur dioxide (µg/m3)
 8-Hour Mean Carbon monoxide (mg/m3)
 24-Hour Mean PM10 (µg/m3 Grav Equiv)

DEFRA acknowledges that air pollution has a significant effect on health and has produced a simple banding index system that is used to create a daily warning system that is issued by the BBC Weather Service to indicate air pollution levels. DEFRA has published guidelines for people suffering from respiratory and heart diseases.

Patients visiting doctors' surgeries, health centres and hospitals are exposed to polluted air that breaches WHO guidelines.  A third of GP surgeries and a quarter of hospitals are in areas that breach WHO guidelines.  Pollutants, notably toxic particles emitted by diesel vehicles, are linked to lifelong health issues like asthma, chronic obstructive pulmonary disease, heart disease, strokes and lung cancer among others.

Pollutants, notably toxic particles emitted by diesel vehicles are entering children's lungs, potentially getting into their blood streams and their brains.  This can effect children's long-term health, even lifelong health, their life expectancies and their intelligence.  The government lost three high court cases because its plans to deal with air pollution were considered too weak, green groups and clean air campaigners frequently criticise the government.  Air pollution leads to 40,000 early deaths annually and seriously impacts the lives of hundreds of thousands more, air pollution costs the NHS and social care services £40m annually.  The UK has also been taken to the European court due to air pollution.  Queen Mary University of London published research on children's exposure to air pollution across the school day and found that they were disproportionately exposed to higher doses of pollution during the school run and whilst at school – particularly at break time in the school playground.

The Royal College of Paediatrics and Child Health, the Royal College of Physicians and Unicef are concerned over winter 2018/2019.  Air pollution will worsen as people burn fuel to heat their homes.  When people's respiratory systems are weakened through air pollution low temperatures will weaken them further this particularly affects children and elderly people.  It is feared hospital patients with respiratory problems will add to the pressure on the NHS which is regularly overburdened in winter.

, approximately 4.5 million children in the UK (one in three) is growing up in a town or city with unsafe levels of particulate pollution.

Remediation
In 2019, toxic air leads to the premature deaths of at least 40,000 people a year in the UK – 9,000 in London – and it leaves hundreds of thousands more suffering serious long-term health problems.

London

London mayor Sadiq Khan launched the Ultra Low Emission Zone (ULEZ) in April 2019 which involves a charge on older diesel and petrol cars with £12.50 per day. This follows the London low emission zone plan operating since 2008.
The ULEZ was expected to cause a 20% reduction in road traffic emissions and resulted in a drop of the worst polluting vehicles entering the zone each day from 35,578 in March to 26,195 in April after the charge was introduced. A poll in April 2019 by YouGov found that 72% of Londoners supported using emissions charging to tackle both air pollution and congestion.

The zone was extended to the North and South Circular from 2021 so that it covers an area containing 3.8 million people. A month into the expansion, TfL said that the proportion of compliant vehicles had risen from 87% to 92%, and the number of the most polluting vehicles had fallen by over a third (from 127,000 to 80,000 on weekdays). The zone will be further extended to the whole of Greater London from 2023.

England Air management
If a local authority finds an area where the targets are not likely to be met, it must declare it an Air Quality Management Area (AQMA) and produce a Local Air Quality Action Plan to improve the air quality. DEFRA has published a list of local authorities with AQMAs. The action plan may include measures for idle reduction of vehicle engines. An example is the Metropolitan Borough of Dudley.

Government
On 26 July 2017, the British government announced plans to ban the sale of new petrol and diesel cars in Britain by 2040. This follows a similar announcement by the French government on 6 July 2017.

Industry
On 25 July 2017, BMW announced that it would start production of an all-electric version of the Mini at its plant in Cowley, Oxfordshire, in 2019. Volvo had earlier announced that all its new cars from 2019 would be electric or hybrid.

See also
Clean Air Act 1956
DAPPLE Project
Environmental history
Environmental issues in the United Kingdom
Environmental Protection UK
Pea soup fog

References

Further reading

Key facts and statistics

General introductions

History of air pollution

External links

UK Air: Air Information Resource from UK Government Department for Environment, Food and Rural Affairs

 
Environmental issues in the United Kingdom